Andrej Vidmar (born March 15, 1956) is a former Yugoslav ice hockey player. He played for the Yugoslavia men's national ice hockey team at the 1984 Winter Olympics in Sarajevo.

References

1956 births
HDD Olimpija Ljubljana players
Ice hockey players at the 1984 Winter Olympics
Living people
Olympic ice hockey players of Yugoslavia
Slovenian ice hockey defencemen
Sportspeople from Ljubljana
Yugoslav ice hockey defencemen
KHL Medveščak Zagreb players